South Asian Americans are Americans of full or partial South Asian ancestry. The term generally excludes Afghanistan, referring specifically to those who can trace back their heritage to the Indian subcontinent, which includes the countries of Bangladesh, Bhutan, India, Maldives, Nepal, Pakistan, and Sri Lanka. The South Asian American diaspora also includes generations of South Asians from other areas in the world who then moved to the United States, areas such as Guyana, Trinidad and Tobago, Jamaica, Suriname, Fiji, South Africa, Uganda, Kenya, Tanzania, Mauritius,  Singapore, Malaysia, Canada, the United Kingdom,  etc. In the United States census they are a subcategory of Asian Americans, although individual racial classification is based on self-identification and the categorization is "not an attempt to define race biologically, anthropologically, or genetically".

Background

History 
In the United States, South Asian Americans have had a presence since the 1700s, emigrating from India. Classically, they were known as East Indians in North America to differentiate them from Caribbean Americans (or West Indians). With the arrival of immigrants from Bengal and Punjab, their population increased significantly in the 1800s. Since interracial marriage with white persons was illegal and South Asian immigrant men were unable to bring over wives from their home countries, Hindu and Muslim South Asian immigrant men married Catholic Mexican women.

Identification
Most Indians do not identify as South Asian, raising concerns for the viability of it as a classification. According to a 2021 survey, just 10% of Indian Americans identified as "South Asian American", with "Indian" and "Indian American" making up the lion's share at 67%. This further breaks down by differing religious identities, just 5% of Hindus of Indian descent in America identify as "South Asian", whereas 27% of Muslims from India identify as "South Asian". Christians from India are more than twice as likely to identify as "American" than Hindus of Indian descent.

Demographics
South Asian Americans are one of the fastest growing groups in the United States, increasing in population from 2.2 million to 4.9 million from 2000 to 2015. Around one third of the group lives in the Southern United States, with the population nearly tripling in the South between 2000 and 2017. According to the U.S. census, between 2000 and 2018 the Indian American population grew by nearly 150 percent and had a median income of $100,000 in 2015.

Following is the list of South Asian diasporas living in the USA arranged according to their 2017 population estimated by the United States Census Bureau.

 Indian Americans (4,402,362) 
 Indo-Caribbean Americans (232,817)
 Indo-Fijian Americans (30,890)
 Bangladeshi Americans (>800,000)
 Pakistani Americans (450,000)
 Nepalese Americans (182,385)
 Sri Lankan Americans (52,448)
 Bhutanese Americans (26,845)
 Maldivian Americans (127)

Geographic distribution in U.S.
South Asians are in higher concentration in California, Illinois, Texas and the Mid-Atlantic (namely New Jersey and New York). As of 2012 the metropolitan areas with the largest South Asian populations are New York, San Francisco Bay Area, Chicago, Washington D.C., Los Angeles, Dallas-Fort Worth and Houston. The states containing the fastest growing metro areas with 5,000 or more South Asians are Washington, California, Nevada, Arizona, Texas, Pennsylvania, Virginia, North Carolina and Florida.

As of 2017, the top 3 locations for Bangladeshis in the U.S. are New York (96,000); New Jersey, California, Michigan (15,000); Texas (13,000). The top 3 locations for Indians are California (464,000), New Jersey (253,000), and Texas (233,000). The 3 locations for Nepalis are Texas (16,000); New York, California (12,000), Virginia (9,000). The top 3 locations for Pakistanis are New York (65,000); Texas(56,000), California (49,000). The top 3 locations for Sri Lankans are California (12,000); New York (6,000); and Texas (5,000).

Cultural influence and notable contributions

Culturally, many South Asians identify themselves using a demonym called Desi.

Entertainment
Comedian and actor Hari Kondabolu is a successful performer in the U.S., famously known for his documentary "The Problem with Apu" which examined the implications of the cartoon character Apu on The Simpsons and its effect on young South Asian Americans growing up in U.S. Other notable actors and entertainers include Mindy Kaling, Padma Lakshmi, Hannah Simone, Aziz Ansari, Kumail Nanjiani, Kunal Nayyar, and Hasan Minhaj. Famous musicians include Curtis Waters, Arthur Gunn, Sameer Gadia—lead singer of Young the Giant, and Norah Jones, daughter of Indian musician Ravi Shankar. Shilpa Ray is an indie and punk rock musician from Brooklyn. Settled in Santa Cruz, California is the family of legendary singer, composer and songwriter Pandit Shiv Dayal Batish who taught Indian music at the University of California and founded the Batish Institute of Indian Music and Fine Arts in the early 1970s. After he died in 2006, the music institute is now run by his son Ashwin Batish and his grandson Keshav Batish both following musically in the footsteps of the elder Batish. The Institute was the third of its kind after ones set up by Ustad Ali Akbar Khan in San Rafael and Pandit Ravi Shankar in Southern California.

Prabal Gurung, a Nepalese American fashion designer based in New York is an established name in American fashion industry. 

Never Have I Ever, a South Asian American comedy drama featured on Netflix in 2020 created by Mindy Kaling and Lang Fisher. It's a show that has been noted for its representation of South Asians in America and a young woman's coming of age story and her connection to her culture and ethnicity.

Nina Davuluri was the first woman of South Asian descent to become Miss America in 2014.

Fine arts
Rina Banerjee is a well known artist whose paintings are inspired by Indian miniature paintings, Chinese silk paintings, and Aztec drawings. Salman Toor is a Pakistani American artist in New York city focusing on queer brown men and South Asian identity and xenophobia. Huma Bhabha is a Pakistani American multimedia artist and her work is inspired by science fiction and she creates monumental sculptures that lack clear backgrounds.

Literature
Jhumpa Lahiri is a Pulitzer Prize winning author, best known for her book, The Namesake, and a professor of creative writing at Princeton University. Kiran Desai, winner of the Man Booker Prize, and is known for the well acclaimed novel, Hullabaloo in the Guava Orchard. Chitra Banerjee Divakaruni is an author and poet and known for her novels on fantasy and magical realism. 

Samrat Upadhyay, a Nepalese American writer is the first writer of Nepali descent to be published in the West. His collection of short stories, Arresting God in Kathmandu was published in 2001. Upadhyay is a professor of creative writing at Indiana University.

Government and politics
After July 2, 1946, under the Luce-Celler Act, Indians were permitted to hold citizenship in the United States.  The Act allowed a quota of 100 immigrants per year from India and allowed Indian nationals who were already residing in the U.S. to become naturalized.

In 1957, Dalip Singh Saund of California became the first Asian American in the United States House of Representatives. In 2017, Ravi Bhalla became the mayor of Hoboken, New Jersey, making him the first Sikh to be elected to the position. In the same year, Kamala Harris became a U.S Senator from California.

In 2019, South Asian Americans were typically enrolled as Democrats. In a study in 2020, Indian Americans strongly identified with the Democratic Party and didn't show a strong shift to the Republican Party. For the 2020 election, a study showed that 72% of registered Indian American voters planned on voting for Biden and the Democratic Party.

In 2020, Kamala Harris became the Democratic vice presidential nominee in the 2020 presidential election, when Joe Biden chose her as his running mate, making her the first African American and South Asian American vice presidential running mate on a major party ticket. The election was won by Joe Biden making Harris the first female and first African American and South Asian American to be held at such a high office.

News media
Amna Nawaz is a correspondent and substitute anchor for the PBS NewsHour and Hari Sreenivasan is a correspondent for the NewsHour and the weekend anchor for the NewsHour. Kiran Chetry, a former CNN newsreader is South Asian (Nepalese) through her father's side. Another notable personality is Fareed Zakaria  who is a journalist, political commentator, and author. He is the host of CNN's Fareed Zakaria GPS and writes a weekly paid column for The Washington Post. He has been a columnist for Newsweek, editor of Newsweek International, and an editor at large of Time. Sree Sreenivasan is a journalist and co-founder of SAJA. He is also a visiting professor at Stony Brook University School of Journalism in New York.

Sports
Mohini Bharadwaj Barry and Raj Bhavsar are two notable and famous Indian American gymnasts. Mohini became the 2nd oldest gymnast to perform in the Olympics in 2004. That same year, Raj Bhavsar was an alternate on the U.S. men's gymnastics team. In 2008, Raj competed with the men's team and won a bronze medal.  In 2003, Gibran Hamdan was drafted by the Washington Redskins and the first player of Pakistani descent in the NFL. Another South Asian player in the NFL was Brandon Chillar. Brandon was a linebacker and drafted by the St. Louis Rams in the 2004 NFL Draft. He played for the Green Bay Packers.

Cricket, a very popular sport in South Asia, is still growing in popularity with South Asian American youth, and especially among Millennial and Gen Z youth as they can watch the sport online and more easily identify as global citizens.

Education
South Asian Americans are often over-represented as university graduates in U.S. census data. Indians ages 25 and older have the highest levels of education among Asian Americans in the U.S. As of 2019, over 75% of Indians ages 25 and older held bachelors and higher level degrees. In contrast, only 15% of Burmese Americans are likely to hold college degrees. In 2021, in Fairfax County, Virginia, a legal case has been filed by a group of Asian American parents against the school board in federal court for overhauling admission procedures which they claim now discriminates against Asian American students. The new policies have decreased Asian American representation at the prestigious Thomas Jefferson high school and a case is now pending if the new admission criteria are legal and indeed race-neutral as claimed by the school board.

Organizations
There are a number of organizations formed by and for the representation of South Asian Americans in a number of fields and industries, including in alphabetical order:

 South Asian Americans Leading Together
 South Asian American Digital Archive
 South Asian Journalists Association
 South Asian Bar Association of North America
 Network of Indian Professionals of North America
 Queer South Asian National Network
 Mann Mukti
 South Asians in Sports
 South Asian Mental Health Initiative and Network - SAMHIN

Podcasts and publications

The Juggernaut focuses on telling stories of the South Asian diaspora and global South Asians at large.

Shankar Vendantam founded and hosts the famous NPR podcast and radio show, Hidden Brain, which discusses various influences that can manipulate our brains with or without our awareness.  
American Born Cultured Desi Podcast converses over the struggles and effects of living as an ABCD (an American Born Confused Desi) and how to balance these two identities and cultures more easily. South Asian Trailblazers is podcast by Simi Shah that examines the careers and journeys of South Asian American leaders and entrepreneurs in various sectors. The Woke Desi podcast discusses various topics familiar to South Asians growing up in the United States and providers a forum where listeners can relate to stories and also become empowered to showcase their identity proudly. The Brown People We Know podcast sharing inspiring interviews with South Asians who have nontraditional life journeys and experiences. South Asian Stories is a podcast that interviews South Asians from around the world, from various walks of life, to discuss their identities, life journeys, failures and successes. Chaat Room, a podcast started by Brown Girl Magazine, recognizes South Asians in Hollywood.

Brown Girl Magazine is an online publication, founded by Trisha Sakhuja-Walia, to give representation to South Asian American writers and particularly South Asian American women, to write their stories and to build a community of empowerment through storytelling and dialogues.

A broader list of South Asian American publications is located here: List of South Asian American–related publications

Customs and traditions

Marriage
Arranged marriage is still observed in some South Asian American families and communities throughout the United States. Marriage data specifically on Asian Americans and Indian Americans shows that interracial marriages are not as common. In 2014, the Pew Research Center found that only 14% of Indian Americans married outside of their ethnic group. Studies show that while many South Asian Americans may date outside of their ethnic group, they end up marrying someone who is considered more compatible and appropriate by society standards. Being raised in the United States, South Asian Americans are part of a culture that encourages dating prior to marriage. But culturally, South Asian American families have different expectations for them than that promoted by Western culture.

Social and political issues

LGBT communities
It has been reported in American media that the group has certain stigmas in relation to the LGBT communities.

Politics in South Asia
In 2019, a group of South Asian Americans petitioned the Bill & Melinda Gates Foundation to cancel a planned award for Indian Prime Minister Narendra Modi.

Poverty
Among South Asians in the U.S., Bhutanese Americans have the highest poverty rates by a significant margin (33.3 percent) with Nepali Americans (24.2 percent) the next highest.

Health Disparities
South Asian Americans face high incidence and prevalence of Type 2 Diabetes Mellitus (T2DM), averaging 28% prevalence compared to 6% in white Americans (Gujral, 2020). T2DM, in the United States, is linked to obesity and a sedentary physical lifestyle. However, studies show SAAs face increased risk of diabetes at a lower body mass index and at younger ages (Shah, 2014). Visceral fat deposit, lower muscle mass, insulin resistance, and improper B-cell function are biological factors that cause higher rates of T2DM in SAAs, by increasing glucose levels in bloodstream. The biological factors above are also influenced by epigenetic, where transgenerational stress from repeated famine affects insulin resistance, although the specific mechanism remains to be revealed (Gujral, 2020). Diet and exercise also play a huge role in T2DM as South Asian diet consists largely of saturated fat, trans fat, and refined carbohydrates, and do not follow CDC recommendation of 150 minutes of moderate exercise (Ali, 2021). New studies show culturally appropriate interventions aimed at weight loss and physical exercise can lower HbA1C levels (Patel, 2017).

See also
 American-Born Confused Desi
 South Asian Canadians

References

Ethnic groups in the United States
South Asian American